Michael Carroll (born 10 September 1952) is a Scottish professional footballer who played as a forward in the Football League.

References

1952 births
Living people
Footballers from Aberdeen
Scottish footballers
Association football forwards
Liverpool F.C. players
Grimsby Town F.C. players
Louth United F.C. players
English Football League players